Mohsenabad (also Romanized as Moḩsenābād) is a village in Zanjanrud-e Bala Rural District, in the Central District of Zanjan County, Zanjan Province, Iran. At the 2006 census, its population was 233, in 71 families.

References 

Populated places in Zanjan County